Oskar J. W. Hansen (March 12, 1892 – August 31, 1971) was a Norwegian-born, naturalized American sculptor. He is most associated with the design of many of the sculptures on and around the Hoover Dam.

Biography
Oskar Johan Waldemar Hansen was born at Langenes in Øksnes, Nordland, Norway. Before coming to America, he served as a merchant seaman. He later served in the United States Army. In the late 1930s or early 1940s, Hansen  built a home and artists studio on property near Ashcroft outside Charlottesville, Virginia.

Selected works
Wings of the Republic - among numerous examples of his sculpture in Art Deco mode commissioned by the US Bureau of Reclamation, executed under the Los Angeles-based architect Gordon B. Kaufmann, supervising architect to the Bureau at Hoover Dam.
Wings - installed in the lobby of the Rand Tower, Minneapolis, completed in 1929.
Liberty - installed in 1957 atop a column replaced one that had been struck by lightning in 1942 at the Yorktown, Virginia, Victory Monument, commemorating the 1781 victory at Yorktown and the alliance with France that brought about the end of the American Revolution and the resulting peace with England.

Gallery

Related Writings
Beyond the Cherubim       (1964)
Sculptures at Hoover Dam  (1960)

References

Related Reading
Hiltzik,  Michael (2010) Colossus: Hoover Dam and the Making of the American Century (New York: Simon and Schuster)

External links
University of Nevada Las Vegas digital library

1892 births
1971 deaths
People from Øksnes
Norwegian emigrants to the United States
20th-century American sculptors
20th-century American male artists
American male sculptors
Art Deco sculptors
Naturalized citizens of the United States